The River class is a class of four minehunters built for the South African Navy. They have a secondary role as Inshore Patrol Vessels.

Development 
In order to circumvent United Nations military sanctions during the apartheid-era, the minehunters were originally ordered and operated by the Department of Transport and designated as research vessels. The initial names of the vessels were Navors (Afrikaans for 'research'), and numbered 1 to 4. 

Ordered in 1978, the first vessel, Navors I, was shipped to Durban from Germany in June 1980 for fitting out, shortly followed by the Navors II. The second pair were constructed in Durban. The vessels were painted blue with white upper works and formed the First Research Squadron.

In 1982, the four vessels were renamed after South African rivers but continued to fly the national flag rather than the naval ensign. 

Only in February 1988 was the prefix RV changed to SAS when they were formally accepted as naval ships.

Current Status 
As of 2022, two River-class vessels are still in service with the South African Navy, however, they are believed to have lost their mine-hunting capabilities due to the retirement of the antiquated PAP104 autonomous underwater vehicles (AUVs).

Whilst still maintaining a decompression chamber for operational diving, the River class are now deployed on general coastal defence duties, and are equipped with a single Oerlikon 20 mm cannon, two 12.7 mm machine guns, and a RHIB for boarding operations.

See also
 List of decommissioned ships of the South African Navy
 List of ships of the South African Navy

References

Mine warfare vessels of the South African Navy